Zubeida Mustafa (born 1941) is a freelance journalist from Pakistan. She became one of the first woman to work in the country's mainstream media, when she joined the Dawn newspaper in 1975.

Early life
Born in British India, Zubeida Mustafa moved to Pakistan with her family after independence of Pakistan. She is married and has two daughters.

Education 
Zubeida Mustafa completed her BA and then her MA in International Relations from the University of Karachi. She also studied at the London School of Economics under a Commonwealth Scholarship.

Career 
Zubeida Mustafa joined the Dawn newspaper's staff, Pakistan's leading English language daily in July 1975 as assistant editor. She was the only woman at Dawn at a senior level position who also was the first woman writer in the mainstream media in Pakistan. During that time, she used her gender to her advantage and covered women's issues stories concerning health and human rights. She used her perspective as a woman to write editorials promoting international peace and pleading for social justice.

As a female journalist, Mustafa has stated that the injustices Pakistani women suffer "touches her deeply". According to a 2012 Newsline magazine profile, she mentions how important it is for women to seize the opportunities given to them. Though women's issues was her main beat, she also focused on education, human empowerment, health and population. She has stated that focusing on education was important since the root of problems in Pakistan was the country's failure to educate its citizens, especially to have awareness of health issues.

According to Newsline (magazine), Zubeida Mustafa considers longtime editor of Dawn newspaper, Ahmed Ali Khan, her mentor who taught her how to "bottle a river in a tumbler (darya ko koozay mein band karna) and how to look at a problem from the people's point of view and to never be unfair in one's writing".

In 1986, Zubeida Mustafa was awarded the Global Media Award for Excellence by The Population Institute in Washington D.C. for her research and writings on population control in Pakistan.

In 2012, Mustafa was awarded a Lifetime Achievement Award by the International Women's Media Foundation for her news coverage on women's issues, politics, education, health and culture. In 2013, the Women Media Center awarded her for her contributions to journalism in Pakistan.

Zubeida Mustafa is not very fond of the current or past Pakistani political leaders. According to her interview to Newsline magazine in 2012, she observed that we have "a bunch of power-hungry leaders who are not statesmen by any yardstick. They are selfish, corrupt and ignorant. They have no strategy to resolve the current crisis nor do they want to".

Zubeida Mustafa retired from her job as a journalist after 33 years of service in 2009 due to some personal health issues. In 2012, she is still facing some health issues including her failing eyesight. As of 2020, she continues to write her newspaper columns as a freelance journalist.

Dawn Media Group has set up an award for women journalists in her name, the Zubeida Mustafa Award for Journalistic Excellence.

Awards and recognition
 Global Media Award for Excellence (1986 and 2004) by The Population Institute, Washington D.C. for her research on population control
 Pakistan Publishers and Booksellers Association (2005) for her contribution in the publication of the literary supplement Books & Authors
 Lifetime Achievement Award (2012) by International Women's Media Foundation (IWMF)
 Women Leaders Award by the President of Pakistan in 2020

Books
 Mustafa, Zubeida (2008). My DAWN Years: Exploring Social Issues (her autobiography about changes she saw in the press in Pakistan over three decades)
 Mustafa, Zubeida (2021). Reforming School Education in Pakistan & the Language Dilemma. Paramount Books

References

External links 
 Official website of Zubeida Mustafa 
 Articles in Dawn as a freelance journalist

Living people
1941 births
St Joseph's Convent School, Karachi alumni
Pakistani women journalists
University of Karachi alumni
Dawn Media Group people